Karl Dodd (born 13 November 1980, in Southport, Queensland, Australia) is an Australian former professional soccer player, who is currently head coach at NPL Queensland club Brisbane City.

Club career 

He played for the Brisbane Strikers before being recruited by the Queensland Roar for the revamped A-League competition. After half a season with the Queensland Roar he signed for Romanian club FC Universitatea Craiova in January 2006. However, after failing to settle with the club he quickly moved on, joining Falkirk on a short-term contract in March 2006.  After impressing manager John Hughes, it was announced on 15 May 2006 that Dodd had agreed a new one-year deal to stay at the club.
On 19 May 2007, after turning down a contract extension at Falkrik, he signed a two-year contract with new A-League franchise Wellington Phoenix. He scored his first professional goal for Phoenix on 19 October 2008.

After two years at Wellington. Dodd turned down a three-year contract, and an offer from Newcastle Jets to try his luck in South Korea, "Karl's been an integral member of the Phoenix," Pignata said. "It's disappointing that we're parting company but we wish him all the best for the future." A cartilage problem in his knee prevented his fortune and returned to Australia for surgery and on return from injury signed for the remainder of the 2008–09 season with NSW Premier League team Sydney United FC.

After a strong pre-season he signed with A-League newcomer North Queensland Fury and made his debut against Sydney FC.

On 3 September 2011, Hong Kong First Division League side TSW Pegasus signed Dodd, who was given number 5 in the following season.

Post playing career 

On 5 June 2013, Dodd became the strength and conditioning coach of the Newcastle Jets FC.
 
In October 2014, Dodd accepted the position of Head Coach of the Western Pride FC Senior Men's Team in the National Premier League (Qld) however in June 2015 he left the club and joined Brisbane Roar FC to take up a position as the High Performance Manager.  Karl resigned from his role as the High Performance Manager at Brisbane Roar FC on 25 March 2017, stating that he was seeking something that "aligns with my professional and personal values"

The Guam Football Association announced that Dodd had signed on as national team manager on 26 December 2017, starting in the next month. Dodd resigned from the post on 16 April, 2021, to return home to Australia in order to deal with a family emergency.

On August 30, 2022, Brisbane City announced it had signed Dodd to coach its senior NPL Queensland men's team for the 2023 season.

Managerial statistics

References

External links 
 North Queensland Fury profile
 Oz Football profile
 Karl Dodd Interview
 Karl Dodd: The man behind the Matao

1980 births
Living people
Soccer players from Queensland
Australian soccer players
Australian expatriate soccer players
Scottish Premier League players
Liga I players
Expatriate footballers in Romania
Expatriate association footballers in New Zealand
Expatriate footballers in Scotland
A-League Men players
National Soccer League (Australia) players
Brisbane Strikers FC players
Falkirk F.C. players
Brisbane Roar FC players
Wellington Phoenix FC players
Northern Fury FC players
Sydney United 58 FC players
FC U Craiova 1948 players
TSW Pegasus FC players
National Premier Leagues players
Expatriate footballers in Hong Kong
Hong Kong First Division League players
Association football central defenders
Australian soccer coaches
Australian expatriate soccer coaches
Sportspeople from the Gold Coast, Queensland
Australian expatriate sportspeople in Hong Kong
Australian expatriate sportspeople in New Zealand
Australian expatriate sportspeople in Scotland
Australian expatriate sportspeople in Romania